John Latham is a former CEO of Madison Guaranty that came into front page national news as a result of the Whitewater investigations.

Madison Guaranty was owned and operated by James and Susan McDougal. On February 7, 1985, Jim McDougal wrote to Gov. Bill Clinton to recommend Latham for the Arkansas State Savings and Loan Board. Richard Massey, a friend of Latham, helped connect Madison Guaranty and the Rose Law Firm to help with legal matters. Hillary Clinton also worked with Latham during this period. On July 11, 1985, an internal  memo from Jim McDougal to John Latham stated, "I need to know everything you have pending before the Securities Commission as I intend to get with Hillary Clinton within the next few days."  On July 11, 1986, the FHLBB told Madison Guaranty's board of directors to remove John Latham because the S&L's troubles had grown worse. John Latham became part of Kenneth Starr's investigation into the Whitewater land deal. John Latham attempted to hide from federal bank examiners a $500,000 insider loan, with a nonrecourse debt that had been made to take a warehouse not on Madison's books. He was jailed for six months for bank fraud.

References

Washington Post, Hillary Clinton and the Whitewater Controversy: A Close-Up, Sunday, June 2, 1996; Page A01.
 CNN Money, Fortune Magazine, Favorite S&L Felonies, November 5, 1990
President Clinton's videotaped testimony at the bank fraud and conspiracy trial of James and Susan McDougal and Gov. Jim Guy Tucker.
 New York Times, "At Whitewater Session, a Struggle to Recall", By STEPHEN LABATON Published: January 12, 1996

Year of birth missing (living people)
Living people
American chief executives of financial services companies
Whitewater controversy